Et Dieu Créa La Femme is the ninth album by West London post punk and indie band The Times released in 1990.<ref name="Discogs.com">[http://www.discogs.com/Times-Et-Dieu-Cr%C3%A9a-La-Femme/release/468714 The Times on Discogs.com]</ref>

Track listing
 Vinil version (Creation Records - CRELP 070)Side ASeptième Ciel - 04:46Aurore Boréale - 04:56Confiance - 04:16Chagrin D'Amour - 04:47Volupté - 04:46
Side BBaisers Volés - 02:27Pour Kylie - 04:26Sucette - 04:181990 Année Erotique - 04:43Extase - 03:17

 CD version (Creation Records - CRECD 070)Septième Ciel - 04:46Aurore Boréale - 04:56Confiance - 04:16Chagrin D'Amour - 04:47Volupté - 04:46Baisers Volés - 02:27Pour Kylie - 04:26Sucette - 04:181990 Année Erotique - 04:43Extase - 03:17I Helped Patrick McGoohan Escape (Thanks For The Trip Dad)'' - 3:31   
untitled bonus tracks - 4:25

Personnel
Edward Ball (vocals, guitar, acoustic guitar)
Paul Heeren (guitar)

References

The Times (band) albums
1990 albums